McCurn is a surname. Notable people with the surname include:

George McCurn (1920–1985), American singer
Neal Peters McCurn (1926–2014), American jurist

See also
McGurn